The 47th parallel north is a circle of latitude that is 47 degrees north of the Earth's equatorial plane. It crosses Europe, Asia, the Pacific Ocean, North America, and the Atlantic Ocean.

At this latitude the sun is visible for 15 hours, 54 minutes during the summer solstice and 8 hours, 31 minutes during the winter solstice. This is the northern limit of the visibility of the star θ Scorpii and thus of the 'tail' of the constellation Scorpius.

Around the world
Starting at the Prime Meridian and heading eastwards, the parallel 47° north passes through:

{| class="wikitable plainrowheaders"
! scope="col" width="125" | Co-ordinates
! scope="col" | Country, territory or sea
! scope="col" | Notes
|-
| 
! scope="row" | 
| Passing just south of Nantes, Montsoreau and Bourges
|-
| 
! scope="row" | 
| Passing just north of Bern
|-
| 
! scope="row" | 
|
|-
| 
! scope="row" | 
|For roughly 300 meters at Grübelekopf
|-
| 
! scope="row" | 
|
|-
| 
! scope="row" | 
| For about 4 km
|-
| 
! scope="row" | 
| For about 3 km
|-
| 
! scope="row" | 
| For about 7 km
|-
| 
! scope="row" | 
| For about 14 km
|-
| 
! scope="row" | 
|
|-
| 
! scope="row" | 
|
|-
| 
! scope="row" | 
| Passing through Lake Balaton
|-
| 
! scope="row" | 
| Passing just south of Oradea and Iași
|-valign="top"
| 
! scope="row" | 
| Passing through Chișinău Passing through Transnistria
|-
| 
! scope="row" | 
| Odessa OblastMykolayiv Oblast — passing through MykolayivKherson Oblast — passing through Kakhovka ReservoirZaporizhzhia Oblast — passing just north of MelitopolDonetsk Oblast — passing through Bilosarayska Spit
|-
| style="background:#b0e0e6;" | 
! scope="row" style="background:#b0e0e6;" | Sea of Azov
| style="background:#b0e0e6;" | Taganrog Bay
|-
| 
! scope="row" | 
|
|-
| 
! scope="row" | 
| Just passing through the northern end of the Caspian Sea
|-
| 
! scope="row" | 
| Xinjiang
|-
| 
! scope="row" | 
|
|-
| 
! scope="row" | 
| Xinjiang - for about 11 km
|-
| 
! scope="row" | 
|
|-
| 
! scope="row" | 
| Xinjiang
|-
| 
! scope="row" | 
|
|-valign="top"
| 
! scope="row" | 
| Inner Mongolia Heilongjiang
|-
| 
! scope="row" | 
|
|-
| style="background:#b0e0e6;" | 
! scope="row" style="background:#b0e0e6;" | Sea of Japan
| style="background:#b0e0e6;" |
|-
| 
! scope="row" | 
| Sakhalin island
|-
| style="background:#b0e0e6;" | 
! scope="row" style="background:#b0e0e6;" | Sea of Okhotsk
| style="background:#b0e0e6;" |
|-
| 
! scope="row" | 
| Island of Simushir, Kuril Islands
|-
| style="background:#b0e0e6;" | 
! scope="row" style="background:#b0e0e6;" | Pacific Ocean
| style="background:#b0e0e6;" |
|-valign="top"
| 
! scope="row" | 
| Washington - Ellensburg
|-valign="top"
| style="background:#b0e0e6;" | 
! scope="row" style="background:#b0e0e6;" | Red River of the North
| style="background:#b0e0e6;" | North Dakota - crosses state line with Minnesota  on the Red River of the North near  Fargo
|-valign="top"
| | 
! scope="row" | 
| Minnesota - intersects 92nd Meridian W near  Duluth
|--valign="top"
| style="background:#b0e0e6;" | 
! scope="row" style="background:#b0e0e6;" | Lake Superior
| style="background:#b0e0e6;" |Minnesota - crosses over North Shore of Lake Superior at  Two Harbors
|-
| 
! scope="row" | 
| Wisconsin - Apostle Islands
|-
| style="background:#b0e0e6;" | 
! scope="row" style="background:#b0e0e6;" | Lake Superior
| style="background:#b0e0e6;" |
|-
| 
! scope="row" | 
| Michigan - Keweenaw Peninsula
|-
| style="background:#b0e0e6;" | 
! scope="row" style="background:#b0e0e6;" | Lake Superior
| style="background:#b0e0e6;" |
|-valign="top"
| 
! scope="row" | 
| Ontario Quebec - passing just north of Montmagny
|-
| 
! scope="row" | 
| Maine
|-
| 
! scope="row" | 
| New Brunswick
|-
| style="background:#b0e0e6;" | 
! scope="row" style="background:#b0e0e6;" | Gulf of Saint Lawrence
| style="background:#b0e0e6;" | Northumberland Strait
|-
| 
! scope="row" | 
| Prince Edward Island
|-
| style="background:#b0e0e6;" | 
! scope="row" style="background:#b0e0e6;" | Gulf of Saint Lawrence
| style="background:#b0e0e6;" |
|-
| 
! scope="row" | 
| Nova Scotia - Cape Breton Island
|-
| style="background:#b0e0e6;" | 
! scope="row" style="background:#b0e0e6;" | Cabot Strait
| style="background:#b0e0e6;" |
|-
| style="background:#b0e0e6;" | 
! scope="row" style="background:#b0e0e6;" | Atlantic Ocean
| style="background:#b0e0e6;" |
|-
| 
! scope="row" | 
| Miquelon Island
|-
| style="background:#b0e0e6;" | 
! scope="row" style="background:#b0e0e6;" | Atlantic Ocean
| style="background:#b0e0e6;" |
|-
| 
! scope="row" | 
| Newfoundland and Labrador - Burin Peninsula, Newfoundland Island
|-
| style="background:#b0e0e6;" | 
! scope="row" style="background:#b0e0e6;" | Placentia Bay
| style="background:#b0e0e6;" |
|-
| 
! scope="row" | 
| Newfoundland and Labrador - Avalon Peninsula, Newfoundland Island
|-
| style="background:#b0e0e6;" | 
! scope="row" style="background:#b0e0e6;" | Atlantic Ocean
| style="background:#b0e0e6;" |
|-
| 
! scope="row" | 
| Belle-Île-en-Mer and Île de Noirmoutier and mainland
|-
|}

See also
46th parallel north
48th parallel north

References

n47